Assembly of the Forces of the Imam's Line or Association of Followers of the Imam's Line is an Iranian reformist political group. The party is a member of Council for coordinating the Reforms Front and Hadi Khamenei is its general secretary. The newspaper Hayat-e-No was associated with the group. The party takes moderate positions and belongs to the left wing.

References 

Reformist political groups in Iran
Political parties established in 1991
1991 establishments in Iran
Khomeinist groups